The Robert Wanslow House is a historic house at 2815 South Q Street in Fort Smith, Arkansas.  It is a two-story structure framed with steel, clad in concrete panels and set on a poured concrete foundation.  It has a flat roof with deep overhanging eaves, and is surrounded by a two-story porch supported by steel beams.  It was built in 1962 to a design by architect Robert Wanslow, for use as his family residence.  The house is locally distinctive for its Mid-Century Modern styling, which contrasts with the more conventional neighboring ranch houses.

The house was listed on the National Register of Historic Places in 1979.

See also
National Register of Historic Places listings in Sebastian County, Arkansas

References

Mid-century modern
Houses on the National Register of Historic Places in Arkansas
Houses completed in 1968
Houses in Fort Smith, Arkansas
National Register of Historic Places in Sebastian County, Arkansas